A reversion in property law is a future interest that is retained by the grantor after the conveyance of an estate of a lesser quantum that he has (such as the owner of a fee simple granting a life estate or a leasehold estate). Once the lesser estate comes to an end (the lease expires or the life estate tenant dies), the property automatically reverts (hence reversion) back to the grantor.  

A reversion interest is logically similar, but not legally identical, to the rights retained by someone who lends his property to another for a limited time. Although the bailee has the right to possess the property during the limited duration, these rights are neither permanent nor exclusive. When the time comes, the property rights of possession will terminate and return to the holder of the reversion.

Reversions are commonly created in real property transactions, particularly during lease arrangements as well as devise (the transfer of real property through a will). In the context of a will, a testator may devise a simple life estate to a devisee. The testator may retain the reversion in the estate or give it to another individual. The owner of the life estate will retain ownership of the property during the devisee's life, and may freely alienate this interest. However, upon the death of the devisee the life estate will terminate and ownership of the real property will fully vest in the holder of the reversion. 

A tenancy for years is a simple illustration of a reversion interest in the context of leasing arrangements. An owner of real property becomes a lessor by transferring a bundle of rights – including a right of entry – to the lessee for a certain period of time. The lessor typically retains a reversion interest in the property which will mature after the lease expires. A common example of this transaction is the leasing of an apartment to a tenant for a one-year period. When the lease expires, the rights of the lessee are terminated and exclusive ownership of the property returns to the lessor. (In most jurisdictions today, tenants' rights legislation has made the practical picture more complicated).

Reversion should not be confused with the possibility of reverter created in the grant of a fee simple determinable. Although both result in the return of the land to the original grantor or his heirs, reversions occur upon the natural expiration of the grantee's estate, while the possibility of reverter actively ends the grantee's otherwise-indefinite estate as a consequence of the grantee's failure to comply with the condition contained in the grant.

Unlike some other future interests, reversions have always been fully alienable ('sellable').

References 

Property law